San Antonio de las Vueltas, also known as Vueltas, is a village and consejo popular ("people's council", i.e. hamlet) in central northern Cuba, belonging to the municipality of Camajuaní, Villa Clara Province. With a population of 13,805 it is the most populated village in the municipality after Camajuaní.

History
Until the 1976 reform it was a municipality and contained the barrios of Aguada de Moya, Bosque, Cabecera (San Antonio de las Vueltas proper), Charco Hondo, Piedra, Quinta, Sagua la Chica, Taguayabón, Vega Alta and Vega de Palma.

Geography
Hills such as Mogote Colorada and  Palenque dot the landscape and the Sagua la Chica River and Manacas River flow through the municipality.

Transport
Vueltas is crossed in the middle by the state highway "Circuito Norte" (CN), and has a railway station (Vueltas-Vega de Palma), in the nearby village of Vega de Palma, on the line Santa Clara-Camajuaní-Remedios-Caibarién.

Education 
Schools in Vueltas include: 

 Santos Caraballé Primary
 Camila Sobrado Primary
 ESBU Rubén Martínez Villena Secondary
 Centro Mixto Andrés Cuevas Heredia Secondary
 IPS Fabricio Ojeda Technology School

Economy
According at the DMPF of Camajuani, Vueltas is a settlement linked to sources of employment or economic development. 

The Provincial Tobacco Company La Estrella has territory in La Quinta, Camajuani,  Aguada de Moya, San Antonio de las Vueltas, and Taguayabón.

Infrastructure 
In La Quinta, Taguayabón, San Antonio de las Vueltas, and Vega de Palma there are a combined total of 13 Municipal Collection Establishment squares. There is also one Twisted Factory in Vueltas.

Personalities
The First Vice President of Cuba, José Ramón Machado Ventura was born in the town in 1930.

See also
Parrandas
Municipalities of Cuba
List of cities in Cuba

References

External links

 San Antonio de las Vueltas on EcuRed
San Antonio de las Vueltas Weather on accuweather.com

Populated places in Villa Clara Province
Populated places established in 1800
1800 establishments in North America
1800 establishments in the Spanish Empire